Lionel Morton (born Lionel Walmsley, 14 August 1942) is an English former musician and television presenter.

Morton was born in Blackburn, Lancashire, England. In the early 1960s, he was the lead vocalist/rhythm guitarist of the group, the Four Pennies. They are best known for their biggest hit single, "Juliet" which reached number one in the UK Singles Chart in May 1964. Morton and his group appeared seven times on the BBC Television music charts programme, Top of the Pops.

From April 1968 to December 1977, he was a regular presenter on the pre-school children's programme Play School., he also reappeared during 1983/4. In the 1970s he went on to present on Play Away. He was formerly married to the actress, Julia Foster for five years, with whom he had a daughter Emily.

Discography

UK singles
1967 "What To Do With Laurie" / "I'll Just Wait Around" (Philips BF 1578)
1967 "First Love Never Dies" / "Try Not To Cry" (Philips BF 1607)
1969 "Waterloo Road" / "Floral Street" (RCA Victor 1875)
1972 "What A Woman Does" / "Listen To The Music" (Cube BUG24)
1974 "Don't Let Life Get You Down" / "Play Away" (BBC BEEB011)

UK albums
1972 Play School (BBC RBT 10)
1973 Lionel (Contour 2870324)
1973 Bang on a Drum (BBC RBT 17)
1973 Play Away (BBC RBT 19)
1975 Hey You! Songs from Play Away (BBC REC 209)
1975 Sing a Song of Play School (BBC REC 212)

References

External links
Oldies.com biography
BBC.co.uk biography
Four Pennies biography and discography

1941 births
Living people
People from Blackburn
English television presenters
BBC television presenters
English rock guitarists
Rhythm guitarists
English rock singers
English male singer-songwriters
English male guitarists